National Highway 921, commonly referred to as NH 921 is a national highway in India. It is a spur road of National Highway 21.  NH-921 runs in the state of Rajasthan in India.

Route 
NH921 connects Mahwa, Mandawar, Garhi Sawai Ram, Pinan, Machadi Mode, Kandholi Bypass, Rajgarh and Rajgarh in the state of Rajasthan.

Junctions  
 
  Terminal near Mahwa.

See also 
 List of National Highways in India
 List of National Highways in India by state

References

External links 

 NH 921 on OpenStreetMap

National highways in India
National Highways in Rajasthan